The International Science and Technology Center (ISTC) is an intergovernmental nonproliferation organization connecting scientists with their peers and research organizations in other countries. The ISTC Headquarters is currently in Nur Sultan, Kazakhstan. Member governments have included Armenia, the European Union, Georgia, Japan,  Kazakhstan, the Republic of Korea, Kyrgyzstan, Norway, Tajikistan, and the United States. Scientists from nearly 60 countries have participated in ISTC activities.

ISTC facilitates international science projects and assists the global scientific and business community to source and engage scientists and institutes that develop or possess an excellence of scientific know-how.

History
The ISTC was established in 1992. Its headquarters were originally in Moscow.

In 2015, the ISTC moved to Astana’s Nazarbayev University.

References

External links
 ISTC website  
 Russia forests
 Annual programmes
 Worldwide science website

Organizations established in 1992
International scientific organizations
Intergovernmental organizations established by treaty
Organizations based in Moscow
Nuclear research institutes in Russia